Monte Fitzgerald Harrison (born August 10, 1995) is an American professional baseball outfielder in the Milwaukee Brewers organization. He has previously played in Major League Baseball (MLB) for the Miami Marlins and Los Angeles Angels.

Career

Amateur career
Harrison played football, baseball and basketball at Lee's Summit West High School in Lee's Summit, Missouri. In football, he had 60 receptions for 1,007 receiving yards, 13 receiving touchdowns, 198 rushing yards, 12 rushing touchdowns and threw a touchdown pass as a senior. He committed to the University of Nebraska to play football in July 2013. He was considered one of the top prospects for the 2014 Major League Baseball Draft and was also one of the top college football recruits. He was ranked as a four-star recruit by Rivals.com, and was their 33rd best wide receiver in the class. Harrison committed to play football at Nebraska over competing offers from schools such as Arkansas, Indiana, Iowa, Kansas, Kansas State, Kentucky, Michigan State, Missouri, Tulsa and Vanderbilt.

Milwaukee Brewers
Harrison was drafted by the Milwaukee Brewers in the second round of the 2014 Major League Baseball draft. He signed with the Brewers on June 14 and was assigned to the Arizona League Brewers where he posted a .261 batting average with one home run and 20 RBIs, along with 32 stolen bases, in 50 games.

In 2015, Harrison began the season with the Wisconsin Timber Rattlers, and after batting only .148 with 11 RBIs in 46 games, he was reassigned to the Helena Brewers, where he finished the season and where he posted a .299 average with three home runs and 13 RBIs in 28 games. In 2016, Harrison returned to the Timber Rattlers and spent the whole season there, batting .221 with six home runs and 37 RBIs in 75 games. He spent the 2017 season with both Wisconsin and the Carolina Mudcats and posted a combined .272 batting average with 21 home runs, 67 RBIs, and 27 stolen bases in 122 games between both clubs.

Miami Marlins

On January 25, 2018, the Brewers traded Harrison, Isan Díaz, Lewis Brinson, and Jordan Yamamoto to the Miami Marlins for Christian Yelich. MLB.com ranked Harrison as Miami's second best prospect going into the 2018 season. In 2018, Harrison spent the season with the Jacksonville Jumbo Shrimp, hitting .240 with 19 home runs, 48 RBIs, and 28 stolen bases in 136 games. After the season, The Marlins added Harrison to their 40-man roster. In 2019, Harrison opened with the New Orleans Baby Cakes. He was named to the 2019 All-Star Futures Game. Over 56 games with New Orleans, he batted .274 with nine home runs, 24 RBIs, and twenty stolen bases.

Harrison was promoted to the major leagues on August 3, 2020, and made his MLB debut the next day. In 32 games for Miami, he hit .170 with one home run and three runs batted in. Harrison also made his postseason debut that year with the Marlins against the Chicago Cubs in the 2020 National League Wild Card Series, where he pinch-ran and had one stolen base.

To begin the 2021 MLB season, Harrison was placed at the Marlins alternate training site. On April 30, Harrison was called up by the Marlins. Harrison went 1-for-5 in three games for the Marlins before being sent down on May 4 to Triple-A Jacksonville.

On March 18, 2022, Harrison was designated for assignment by Miami. He was released by the team on March 26.

Los Angeles Angels
On April 5, 2022, Harrison signed a minor league contract with the Los Angeles Angels organization. He was promoted to the major league roster on June 24 after Juan Lagares was designated for assignment. On July 13, the Angels designated Harrison for assignment. He cleared waivers and was sent outright to the Triple-A Salt Lake Bees on July 18. On October 12, Harrison elected free agency.

Milwaukee Brewers (second stint)
On January 30, 2023, Harrison signed a minor league contract with the Milwaukee Brewers organization.

Personal
His brother, Shaquille Harrison, is a professional basketball player in the NBA. Harrison's father, Jack, died due to a heart attack when he was in first grade.

References

External links

Nebraska Cornhuskers bio

1995 births
Living people
African-American baseball players
Arizona League Brewers players
Baseball players from Missouri
Carolina Mudcats players
Criollos de Caguas players
Helena Brewers players
Jacksonville Jumbo Shrimp players
Jupiter Hammerheads players
Liga de Béisbol Profesional Roberto Clemente outfielders
Los Angeles Angels players
Major League Baseball outfielders
Miami Marlins players
New Orleans Baby Cakes players
People from Lee's Summit, Missouri
Players of American football from Missouri
Salt River Rafters players
Wisconsin Timber Rattlers players
21st-century African-American sportspeople